Just Relations is a Miles Franklin Award-winning novel by Australian author Rodney Hall.

The novel won the Miles Franklin Award, the FAW ANA Literature Award, and the FAW Barbara Ramsden Award for the Book of the Year, in 1982.

References
Middlemiss.org

1982 Australian novels
Miles Franklin Award-winning works